Bloody Buccaneers is an album by Dutch hard rock band Golden Earring, released in 1991 (see 1991 in music).

Track listing
All songs written by Hay and Kooymans except where noted.

"Making Love to Yourself" (Hay, Kooymans, Zuiderwijk) – 4:52
"Temporary Madness" – 3:33
"Going to the Run" – 3:53
"Joe" – 4:37
"Planet Blue" – 4:21
"Bloody Buccaneers" – 4:49
"One Shot Away from Paradise" (Gerritsen) – 3:45
"When Love Turns to Pain" (Gerritsen) – 4:47
"In a Bad Mood" – 5:23
"Pourin' My Heart Out Again" – 3:59

Personnel
Rinus Gerritsen - bass, keyboard
Barry Hay - vocals
George Kooymans - guitar, vocals
Cesar Zuiderwijk - drums

Production
Producers: Golden Earring, John Sonneveld
Engineer: John Sonneveld
Design: Sander F. Van Hest
Cover design: Koos O.
Artwork: Koos O., Sander F. Van Hest
Illustrations: Koos O., Sander F. Van Hest
Photography: Kees Tabak(nl)

Cover versions
Russian heavy metal band Aria covered "Going to the Run" song with adapted lyrics in Russian ("Беспечный ангел" by Margarita Pushkina). It was first released in 1999 and then in 2004 (on the eponymous ballad compilation).

Charts

Certifications

Notes 

Golden Earring albums
1991 albums